The whiskered flying squirrel (Petinomys genibarbis) is a species of flying squirrel. It is found in Indonesia and Malaysia.

References

Thorington, R. W. Jr. and R. S. Hoffman. 2005. Family Sciuridae. pp. 754–818 in Mammal Species of the World a Taxonomic and Geographic Reference. D. E. Wilson and D. M. Reeder eds. Johns Hopkins University Press, Baltimore.

Petinomys
Rodents of Malaysia
Rodents of Indonesia
Mammals described in 1824
Taxonomy articles created by Polbot